Županija (singular; plural županije) or Župnija (singular; plural župnije) is a South Slavic administrative subdivision.

For the etymology, see Župa.

The term Županija is used in:
 Croatia: counties of Croatia
Cantons of the Federation of Bosnia and Herzegovina are frequently referred to as županije by the Bosnian Croat population.

Types of administrative division
Subdivisions of Croatia
Subdivisions of Bosnia and Herzegovina

pl:Županija